The 2011 Nigerian Senate election in Kogi State was held on April 11, 2011, to elect members of the Nigerian Senate to represent Kogi State. Nurudeen Usman-Abatemi representing Kogi East and Emmanuel Dangana Ocheja representing Kogi Central and Smart Adeyemi representing Kogi West won on the platform of Peoples Democratic Party.

Overview

Summary

Results

Kogi East 
Peoples Democratic Party candidate Nurudeen Usman-Abatemi won the election, defeating Congress for Progressive Change candidate Dahrum Abdullahi and other party candidates.

Kogi Central 
Peoples Democratic Party candidate Emmanuel Dangana Ocheja won the election, defeating Congress for Progressive Change candidate Edmund Tanor and other party candidates.

Kogi East 
Peoples Democratic Party candidate Smart Adeyemi won the election, defeating Congress for Progressive Change candidate Faniyi T Joseph and other party candidates.

References

April 2011 events in Nigeria
Kogi
Kogi State Senate elections